Baddesley Preceptory was a preceptory of the Knights Hospitaller at North Baddesley in Hampshire, England. The preceptory was founded at Godsfield but was moved soon after the Black Death.

Foundation
Land in Godsfield, Hampshire was first granted to the Hospitallers by Henry of Blois, Bishop of Winchester in the time of King John and in 1207 further land there was given by Adam de Port. There were further grants of land in Preston Candover and Child Candover. It is not known when a preceptory was first formed, but it was prior to 1304.

12th to 16th centuries
By 1355 the preceptory had moved to Baddesley, although it was still sometimes called Godsfield. The establishment was small with only the Preceptor a chaplain and four servants. They held managed land and buildings in several places in Hampshire, including Godsfield, Baddesley, Rownham and the former Knights Templar possessions at Temple.

Dissolution
The Valor of 1535 lists the annual value of the preceptory as £131 14s. 1d.. It was suppressed in 1540 and the lands were granted first to Sir Thomas Seymour, and later, in 1551, to Sir Nicholas Throckmorton.

Present day
The 14th century chapel and priest's house at Godsfield survive. Nothing remains of the preceptory at North Baddesley, the site being occupied by the 18th century Baddesley Manor.

References
"House of Knights Hospitallers: Preceptory of Baddesley or Godsfield", A History of the County of Hampshire, volume 2, The Victoria County History, 1973.

History of Hampshire
Monasteries in Hampshire
Preceptories of the Knights Hospitaller in England
13th-century establishments in England
1540 disestablishments in England
Christian monasteries established in the 13th century